Corynanthera is a genus of the botanical family Myrtaceae, first described as a genus in 1979. It contains only one known species, Corynanthera flava, endemic to Shire of Irwin in Western Australia.

References

Myrtaceae
Monotypic Myrtaceae genera
Endemic flora of Southwest Australia
Myrtales of Australia
Rosids of Western Australia